United Nations Security Council Resolution 1801 was unanimously adopted on 20 February 2008.

Resolution 
The Security Council this afternoon extended its authorization of the African Union Mission in Somalia (AMISOM) for a further period of six months, until 20 August.

Unanimously adopting resolution 1801 (2008) and acting under Chapter VII of the United Nations Charter, the Council authorized AMISOM to take all necessary measures, as appropriate, to carry out its mandate, as set out in resolution 1772 (2007) (see Press Release SC/9101), underlining that the Mission could take all necessary measures to provide security for key infrastructure and to contribute to the creation of the necessary security conditions for the provision of humanitarian assistance.

By the text, the Council reaffirmed its intention to take measures against those who sought to prevent or block a peaceful political process, or those who threatened the Transitional Federal Institutions or AMISOM by force, or took action that would undermine stability in Somalia or the region.

The Council also affirmed its intention to meet promptly following the Secretary-General’s report, expected for 10 March, which would offer specific options and recommendations to strengthen the ability of the United Nations Political Office in Somalia (UNPOS), to support further the full deployment of AMISOM, and to prepare for the possible deployment of a United Nations peacekeeping force to succeed AMISOM.

Emphasizing the continued contribution made to Somalia’s peace and security by the arms embargo imposed by resolution 733 (1992) and subsequent amendments, the Council demanded that all Member States comply fully with it.  It encouraged Member States whose naval vessels and military aircraft operate in international waters and airspace adjacent to Somalia’s coast to be vigilant to piracy and to take appropriate action to protect merchant shipping, especially concerning the transportation of humanitarian aid.  It welcomed the contribution made by France to protect World Food Programme (WFP) naval convoys and the support now provided by Denmark.

After the vote, South Africa’s representative said his delegation had voted in favour, even though it would have preferred that the Council had deferred taking a decision until the requested report of the Secretary-General had been received.  A compromise had been accepted, by which the Council would consider the matter immediately after receipt of the report.   The Secretary-General’s report would provide the Council with alternative approaches to the issue of Somalia.  The Council had to demonstrate that its mandate to maintain international peace and security applied to Somalia, as well.

He said AMISOM had been doing a great job, despite its capacity challenges.  Lack of capacity, however, was not the only problem AMISOM confronted.  Another problem was that AMISOM had been deployed as a stop-gap mission until the United Nations could take over.  The international community must provide AMISOM not only with the necessary resources, it also had the obligation to support the political process necessary for bringing peace and stability to the country.

See also 
List of United Nations Security Council Resolutions 1801 to 1900 (2008–2009)

References

External links
Text of the Resolution at undocs.org

 1801
 1801
February 2008 events
2008 in Somalia